The Environmental Vulnerability Index (EVI) is a measurement devised by the South Pacific Applied Geoscience Commission (SOPAC), the United Nations Environment Program and others to characterize the relative severity of various types of environmental issues suffered by 243 enumerated individual nations and other geographies (such as Antarctica). The results of the EVI are used to focus on planned solutions to negative pressures on the environment, whilst promoting sustainability.

Development 
The beginning stages of the Environmental Vulnerability Index (EVI) were developed to be appropriate for Small Island Developing States (SIDs), this theoretical idea at the time was presented by the South Pacific Applied Geoscience Commission (SOPAC) on February 4, 1999.  The ideas and plans for The Environmental Vulnerability Index were worked on further with the creation of a (EVI) Think Tank that took place from September 7–10, 1999 in Pacific Harbour, Fiji. Expanding the (EVI) to other SIDS was aided by a meeting of experts convened in Malta on November 29 – December 3, 1999 by (SOPAC) and the Foundation for International Studies (of the University of Malta's Islands and Small States Institute) with the support of the United Nations Environment Programme (UNEP).

During the second phase of the development, the Environmental Vulnerability Index (EVI) was tested in five different countries. A workshop was made to expand the application of the Environmental Vulnerability Index to a demonstrative set of countries from around the world. The workshop was hosted by UNEP in Geneva, Switzerland on August 27 – August 29, 2001.  Continuation of work and development on The Environmental Vulnerability Index, lead to a presentation of the first functional results with the Demonstration EVI.

Calculation 
To be able to calculate an Environmental Vulnerability Index it requires the compilation of relevant environmental vulnerability data for the 50 indicators. Once compiled then this data must be used to calculate each indicator. As the indicators are heterogeneous, include variables for which responses are numerical, qualitative and on different scales (linear, non-linear, or with different ranges) they are mapped onto a 1–7 vulnerability scale. Where data is not available, no value is given for the indicator and the denominator of the average adjusted down by one value. Where an indicator is considered 'non-applicable' in a country (such as volcanic eruptions in Tuvalu which has no volcanoes), the lowest vulnerability score of 1 is attributed to that indicator. The vulnerability scores for each indicator are then accumulated either into categories or sub-indices and the average calculated. An overall average of all indicators is calculated to generate the country EVI. The EVI is accumulated into three sub-indices: Hazards, Resistance, Damage

The 50 EVI indicators are also divided up in the issue categories for use as required: Climate change, Biodiversity, Water, Agriculture and fisheries, Human health aspects, Desertification, and Exposure to Natural Disasters.

Indicators 
 High Winds – Average annual excess winds over the last five years (summing speeds on days during which the maximum recorded wind speed is greater than 20% higher than the 30 year average maximum wind speed for that month) averaged over all reference climate stations.
 Dry Periods – Average annual rainfall deficit (mm) over the past 5 years for all months with more than 20% lower rainfall than the 30 year monthly average, averaged over all reference climate stations.
 Wet Periods – Average annual excess rainfall (mm) over the past 5 years for all months with more than 20% higher rainfall than the 30 year monthly average, averaged over all reference climate stations
 Hot Periods – Average annual excess heat (degrees C) over the past 5 years for all days more than 5°C (9°F) hotter than the 30 year mean monthly maximum, averaged over all reference climate stations.
 Cold Periods – Average annual heat deficit (degrees C) over the past 5 years for all days more than 5°C (9°F) cooler than the 30 year mean monthly minimum, averaged overall reference climate stations.
Sea Temperatures – Average annual deviation in Sea Surface Temperatures (SST) in the last 5 years in relation to the 30 year monthly means
Volcanoes – Cumulative volcano risk as the weighted number of volcanoes with the potential for eruption greater than or equal to a Volcanic Explosively Index of 2 (VEI 2) within 100 km of the country land boundary (divided by the area of land).
Earthquakes – Cumulative earthquake energy within 100 km of country land boundaries measured as Local Magnitude (ML) ≥ 6.0 and occurring at a depth of less than or equal to fifteen kilometers(≤15 km depth) over 5 years (divided by land area).
Tsunamis – Number of tsunamis or storms surges with run-up greater than 2 meters above Mean High Water Spring tide (MHWS) per 1000 km coastline since 1900.
Slides – Number of slides recorded in the last 5 years (EMDAT definitions), divided by land area
Land Area – Total land area (km2)
Country Dispersion – Ratio of length of borders (land and maritime) to total land area.
Isolation – Distance to nearest continent (km)
Relief – Altitude range (highest point subtracted from the lowest point in country)
Lowlands – Percentage of land area less than or equal to 50m above sea level
Borders – Number of land and sea borders (including EEZ shared with other countries.)
Ecosystem Imbalance – Weighted average change in trophic level since fisheries began (for trophic level slice ≤3.35).
Environmental Openness – Average annual USD freight imports over the past 5 years by any means per km2 land area
Migrations – Number of known species that migrate outside the territorial area at any time during their life spans (including land and all aquatic species) / area of land
Endemics – Number of known endemic species per million square kilometer land area
Introductions – Number of introduced species per 1000 square kilometer of land area
Endangered Species – Number of endangered and vulnerable species per 1000 km2 land area (IUCN definitions)
Extinctions – Number of species known to have become extinct since 1900 per 1000 km2 land area (IUCN definitions)
Vegetation Cover – Percentage of natural and regrowth vegetation cover remaining (include forests, wetlands, prairies, tundra, desert and alpine associations).
Loss Of Cover – Net percentage change in natural vegetation cover over the last five years
Habitat fragmentation – Total length of all roads in a country divided by land area. 
Degradation – Percent of land area that is either severely or very severely degraded (FAO/AGL Terrastat definitions)
Terrestrial Reserves – Percent of terrestrial land area legally set aside as no take reserves 
Marine Reserves – Percentage of continental shelf legally designated as marine protected areas (MPAs).
Intensive Farming – Annual tonnage of intensively farmed animal products (includes aquaculture, pigs, poultry) produced over the last five years per square kilometer land area.
Fertilizers – Average annual intensity of fertilizer use over the total land area over the last 5 years.
Pesticides – Average annual pesticides used as kg/km2/year over total land area over last 5 years.
Biotechnology – Cumulative number of deliberate field trials of genetically modified organisms conducted in the country since 1986.
Productivity Over-fishing – Average ratio of productivity : fisheries catch over the last 5 years
Fishing Effort – Average annual number of fishers per kilometer of coastline over the last 5 years
Renewable Water – Average annual water usage as percentage of renewable water resources over the last 5 years
SO2 Emissions – Average annual SO2 emissions over the last 5 years.
Generated and imported toxic, hazardous and municipal wastes per square kilometer land area over the last 5 years
Waste Treatment – Mean annual percent of hazardous, toxic and municipal waste effectively managed and treated over the past 5 years.
Industry – Average annual use of electricity for industry over the last 5 years per square kilometer of land
Spills – Total number of spills of oil and hazardous substances greater than 1000 liters on land, in rivers or within territorial waters per million km maritime coast during the last five years
Mining – Average annual mining production (include all surface and subsurface mining and quarrying) per km2 of land area over the past 5 years.
Sanitation – Density of population without access to safe sanitation (WHO definitions)
Vehicles – Number of vehicles per square kilometer of land area (most recent data)
Population – Total human population density (number per km2 land area)
Population Growth – Annual human population growth rate over the last 5 years
Tourists Average annual number of international tourists per km2 land over the past 5 years.
Coastal Settlements – Density of people living in coastal settlements, i.e. with a city center within 100 km of any maritime or lake* coast.
Environmental Agreements  – Number of environmental treaties in force in a country.
Conflicts – Average number of conflict years per decade within the country over the past 50 years.

List

See also 
Biotic index, a simple measurement of stream pollution and its effects on the biology of the stream.
Climate Vulnerability Monitor (CVM)
Environmental Performance Index (EPI)
Environmental Sustainability Index (ESI)

References

Further reading
 Kaly U, Pratt C and Mitchell J (2004) Environmental Vulnerability Index (EVI) 2004 SOPAC.
 Barnett J, Lambert S and Fry I (2008) "The Hazards of Indicators: Insights from the Environmental Vulnerability Index" Annals of the Association of American Geographers, 98 (1).

External links
 Environmental Vulnerability Index Official website.

Environmental science
Vulnerability
Vulnerability